Kolio Tumanuvao Etuale (born March 17, 1973) is a Samoan priest of the Catholic Church who has been serving as coadjutor bishop for the Diocese of Samoa–Pago Pago since 2022.

Biography
Kolio Etuale was born in Lotofaga, Samoa, on March 17, 1973.  On March 29, 2003, Etuale was ordained to the priesthood by Bishop John Quinn Weitzel for the Diocese of Samoa-Pago Pago

Pope Francis appointed Etuale as coadjutor bishop for the Diocese of Samoa–Pago Pago on August 4, 2022.  On November 4, 2022, Etuale was consecrated by Bishop Peter Hugh Brown.

See also

 Catholic Church hierarchy
 Catholic Church in the United States
 Historical list of the Catholic bishops of the United States
 List of Catholic bishops of the United States
 Lists of patriarchs, archbishops, and bishops

References

External links
Roman Catholic Diocese of Samoa–Pago Pago Official Site

Episcopal succession

1973 births
Living people
American Roman Catholic priests
Bishops appointed by Pope Francis